TubeMogul is an enterprise software company for brand advertising.

TubeMogul is headquartered in Emeryville, California and has global offices located in Chengdu (China), Chicago, Detroit, Kiev, New York, London, Los Angeles, Minneapolis, Paris, São Paulo, Singapore, Shanghai, Sydney, Toronto, and Tokyo.

In November 2016, Adobe Systems Incorporated announced an agreement to acquire TubeMogul.

Company history

2007–2009

TubeMogul was founded by Brett Wilson and John Hughes while enrolled as MBA students at the University of California Berkeley's Haas School of Business. In 2007, the TubeMogul team led by Wilson and Hughes won the Haas Business Plan Competition, which provided seed money enabling the development and launch of the product. In its original conception, TubeMogul was a cross-platform online video analytics tool in 2007. Video producers uploaded content through TubeMogul, which would then distribute and track performance across video sharing sites.

2010–2013

In 2010, TubeMogul launched Playtime, an online video ad network, to help advertisers deliver ads to their target audience. Playtime differentiated itself from other online ad networks with its self-service features as well as the level of transparency it provided. In 2011, TubeMogul combined the Playtime ad network with the video syndication platform to become a demand-side platform (DSP) for brand advertisers. TubeMogul's DSP aggregates multiple inventory sources, including advertising exchanges, supply-side platforms, advertising networks as well as direct relationships with premium publishers, local and national broadcasters, cable networks and multichannel video programming distributors.

In 2012, TubeMogul introduced its BrandSafe technology, which ensured that advertisements did not appear alongside objectionable content or run in ineffectively-small video players. In 2013, TubeMogul launched BrandPoint, which allows marketers to execute digital video buys on a gross rating point (GRP) basis, traditionally used by TV advertisers to measure a campaign's effectiveness. In March 2016, TubeMogul partnered with Facebook to reach TV audiences via Nielsen data.

2014

TubeMogul became a publicly traded company on July 18, 2014, and is listed with the NASDAQ Global Select Market using the ticker symbol "TUBE" (See ).

In December 2014, TubeMogul released PTV, a Programmatic TV software solution that allows advertisers to plan and execute data-driven local, national, addressable and VOD television media buys.

2015–present

In November 2015, TubeMogul launched technology enabling cross-screen advertising planning. The software helps marketers understand which media channels to invest in by deduplicating their target audience across traditional TV, social platforms and digital channels. This technique improved upon previous solutions that only allowed advertisers to control reach and frequency across digital-only desktop and mobile devices.

Also in 2015, TubeMogul participated in a third-party assessment of Video Demand Side Platforms conducted by Forrester Research. In the Q4 2015 Wave Report, TubeMogul was named a leader among video advertising demand-side platforms and was also awarded the highest ranking in the "Current Offering" category. The results were based on three key categories: current offering, strategy and market presence. Out of ten companies evaluated, TubeMogul received the highest score in "Planning Capabilities," achieving 4.60 out of 5 possible points, and 5 out of 5 points in both "TV Campaign Extension" and "Client Satisfaction" categories.

In 2016, TubeMogul announced partnerships and integrations with the social media platforms Facebook, Instagram, Twitter and SnapChat.
 TubeMogul received the distinction of being the first video advertising platform awarded a Partner Marketing badge from Facebook  and was one of eight advertising partners chosen by Snapchat in their initial monetization release strategy.

Financing

TubeMogul received its initial funding after winning the Lester Center's Business Plan Competition while co-founders John Hughes and Brett Wilson were studying at UC Berkeley’s Haas School of Business in 2007. The company received seed funding from NetService Ventures later that same year.

In February 2008, TubeMogul raised $3 million in Series A funding led by Trinity Ventures. In October 2008, they acquired Illuminex, a video analytics company founded by Jason Lopatecki and Adam Rose, for an undisclosed amount.

They raised a combined $10 million in their Series B round in March 2009, led by Foundation Capital. In December 2012 the company raised $28 million in the first tranche of its Series C, led by Northgate Capital. The second tranche of the Series C was led by SingTel Innov8, corporate venture capital arm of the SingTel Group, along with Cross Creek Capital, for $10 million in May 2013.

IPO

TubeMogul filed its S-1 form with the SEC on March 26, 2014. On July 18, 2014 TubeMogul became a publicly traded company. They made 6.3 million shares available to investors at $7 per share to raise a total of $43.8 million in their initial offering.

Adobe acquisition

In November 2016, Adobe Systems Incorporated announced an agreement to acquire TubeMogul for $14 per share, or approximately $540 million, in cash. The deal is expected to close in Adobe's first quarter of 2017.

Industry initiatives

Non-Human Traffic Credit Program
In February 2016, TubeMogul announced the development of a new anti-ad fraud initiative called the Non-Human Traffic Credit Program. Effective April 2016, the company will automatically refund clients whose ads were served to non-human traffic, also known as bots. TubeMogul partnered with ad fraud detection company White Ops, which will apply its verification technology across every video ad bought through TubeMogul's Open RTB platform. The service is available to all clients who have a master service agreement with TubeMogul.

Independence Matters
In March 2016, TubeMogul launched an advertising campaign alleging Google's dual position as both media owner as well as buying platform creates inherent conflicts of interests for marketers. 

TubeMogul claims that "Google has made a conscious decision to wall itself off from the rest of the industry." The campaign hints at Google's move to restrict third-party companies from buying YouTube ads via the DoubleClick Ad Exchange.

Open Video Viewability (OpenVV)
In May 2013, TubeMogul and several other advertising technology vendors formed the Open Video View (OpenVV) consortium to help facilitate the adoption of a viewability standard for online video advertising. 
OpenVV is an open-source code that provides marketers verification that their ad was actually seen by human eyes and reasons for non-viewability. TubeMogul founded the initiative along with video technology vendors BrightRoll, Innovid, SpotXChange, and LiveRail; current members include Nielsen, comScore, TrustE, and VivaKi.

In June 2015, the IAB Tech Lab took over management of the OpenVV initiative as they continued to ramp up efforts in creating a common, scalable and interoperable technical solution to effectively measure viewability for video. The transfer of management for OpenVV marked the first industry initiative to be on-boarded into the IAB Tech Lab, a nonprofit research and development organization charged with producing and helping companies implement global industry technical standards and solutions.

Fraud/Fake Pre-Roll
In 2012, TubeMogul launched fakepreroll.com to raise awareness about video ads that were shown in inventory normally reserved for display advertisements, oftentimes without the marketer's knowledge.
The site was taken down after several companies sent TubeMogul cease-and-desist orders.

Botnet detection
In 2014, TubeMogul reported the existence of three botnets, responsible for defrauding advertisers for a potential $10 million each month.

IPG internship
In March 2014, IPG Mediabrands and TubeMogul announced the "Ad-Tech Apprenticeship," a one-year intensive training program designed to give college graduates a holistic view of the digital advertising industry.

Awards
 2009 South by Southwest (SXSW) Best Online Video-Related Technology Winner
 2009 AlwaysOn OnMedia 100 Award Winner
 2012 AlwaysOn Global 250 Winner
 2013 Inc. Top 100 Advertising and Marketing Companies #29
 2013 Inc. Hire Power Award Top 10 Advertising and Marketing Companies #9
 2013 Lead 411 Tech200 #14
 2013 Deloitte Fast 500 #35
 2013 iMedia Connection ASPY Awards – Winner Best Customer Service Award
 2014 San Francisco Business Times Best Places to Work #35
 2014 The Drum Digital Trading Awards – Winner Advertiser's Choice of Ad technology
 2014 AIMA Awards – Winner Outstanding Technical Achievement for Viewability Reporting and Audit
 2015 Glassdoor – Winner "Best Places to Work" People's Choice Awards, TubeMogul was ranked 5th for companies with less than 1,000 employees.
 2015 iMedia ASPY Awards – Best Video Partner
 2015 The Drum Digital Trading Awards – Winner Most Effective Programmatic Media Partnership.
 2016 iMedia ASPY Awards – Best Video Partner
 2016 The Drum Digital Trading Awards – Winner Most Effective Programmatic Media Partnership.
 2016 Fortune Great Places to Work – Winner "Top 100 Places to Work for Millennials"
 2016 Digiday Video Awards – Winner Best Video Advertising Partners.

Open source contributions
TubeMogul is both a consumer of and contributor to free and open source software. TubeMogul's contributions include a list of Puppet Modules released on the Puppet Forge, and OpenVV.

TubeMogul also contributes to an Engineering Blog, other open source projects on GitHub, meetup, and public talk at conferences like Velocity, USENIX LISA, SRECon, SuiteWorld, Puppet Camp, OpenStack Summit, Nagios World.

TubeMogul has adopted successfully a private cloud strategy while going through hyper-growth and leveraging the open source project OpenStack. The solution is now providing the base of the Adobe Advertising Cloud.

See also
 Demand-side platform
 Online advertising
 Real-time bidding
 Video ad platform
 Video advertising

References

2007 establishments in California
Online advertising
Big data companies
American companies established in 2007
Software companies established in 2007
Software companies based in California
Companies based in Emeryville, California
Companies formerly listed on the Nasdaq
2014 initial public offerings
2017 mergers and acquisitions
Defunct software companies of the United States
Adobe Inc.